The 2019 Sydney Sevens was the fourth tournament within the 2018–19 World Rugby Sevens Series and the seventeenth edition of the Australian Sevens. It was held over the weekend of 2–3 February 2019 at Spotless Stadium in Sydney, with former venue Allianz Stadium closed for rebuilding. It was run alongside the women's tournament.

Format
The teams are drawn into four pools of four teams each. Each team plays every other team in their pool once. The top two teams from each pool advance to the Cup bracket where teams compete for the Gold, Silver, and Bronze Medals. The bottom two teams from each group go to the Challenge Trophy bracket.

Teams
Fifteen core teams played in the tournament along with one invitational team, the highest-placing non-core team of the 2018 Oceania Sevens Championship, Tonga:

Pool stage
All times in Australian Eastern Daylight Time (UTC+11:00)

Pool A

Pool B

Pool C

Pool D

Knockout stage

Thirteenth Place

Challenge Trophy

5th Place

Cup

Tournament placings

Source: World Rugby

Players

Scoring leaders

Source: World Rugby

Dream Team
The following seven players were selected to the tournament Dream Team at the conclusion of the tournament:

See also
 World Rugby Sevens Series
 2018–19 World Rugby Sevens Series
 2019 Sydney Women's Sevens

References

External links
 Tournament site
 Tournament Page

2019
2018–19 World Rugby Sevens Series
2019 in Australian rugby union
2019
February 2019 sports events in Australia